Irvine Ranch Water District (IRWD) is a California Special District formed in 1961 and incorporated under the California water code. IRWD headquarters are located in Irvine, California.

IRWD offers the following services: potable water sales, sewer service and sale of reclaimed (or recycled) water and serves the city of Irvine and portions of Costa Mesa, Lake Forest, Newport Beach, Orange, Tustin and unincorporated areas of Orange County.

Governance 
IRWD is governed by a five-member publicly elected Board of Directors. These five elected officials are responsible for the District's policies and decision making. Public elections are held every two years and Directors serve four-year terms. Terms are staggered to ensure continuity.

1. John Withers – John B. Withers has served on the IRWD Board of Directors since 1989 when appointed, was reappointed in 1990 and has been subsequently re-elected to serve on the Board. He served as President of the Board in 2004 and in a number of other officer capacities as well.

2. Karen McLaughlin – Karen McLaughlin, Ph.D., was elected to the Irvine Ranch Water District Board of Directors in 2020, representing Division 4.

3. Douglas Reinhart – Douglas J. Reinhart was appointed to the IRWD Board of Directors in 2004 to fill a board vacancy and was subsequently appointed to a four-year term in 2006 when he ran unopposed for election. He served as President of the Board in 2009 and 2010, having previously served as Vice President in 2006 and President in 2007 and 2013.

4. Steve LaMar –Steven E. LaMar was appointed to the IRWD Board of Directors in February 2009 to fill a vacancy and then was elected in the November 2010 election. He served as Board President in 2011.

5. Peer Swan – Peer Swan was elected to the IRWD Board of Directors in 1979. After a term as Vice President of the Board, the Directors elected him President, a position he held from December 1981 until December 1995 and again in 2006. Swan was reelected to the Board without opposition in 2006 and 2010.

District facilities & water supply 

IRWD's drinking water comes from two primary sources: local groundwater and imported water from the Metropolitan Water District of Southern California. The blending of these sources varies according to the time of year and the geographic location within the District. In addition, IRWD has an extensive recycled water program that is used for irrigation or other non-potable purposes. The District's diversified supply ensures a reliable water supply during times of drought, regulatory constraints and other emergencies. A diverse water supply portfolio helps to keep IRWD rates as low as possible.

Groundwater
Approximately 48 percent of IRWD's overall supply comes from local groundwater wells in the Orange County Groundwater Basin, and the Irvine and Lake Forest sub-basins. For many years, IRWD received almost all of its water from imported sources. To alleviate this dependency on expensive imported water, IRWD began to develop a series of local wells in 1979. The Dyer Road Wellfield Project extracts low-cost, high-quality water from deep within the Orange County Groundwater Basin. IRWD now operates 25 groundwater wells within its service area.

Imported Water
Approximately 20 percent of IRWD’s water is purchased through the Municipal Water District of Orange County from the Metropolitan Water District of Southern California, a regional water wholesaler that delivers imported water from Northern California and the Colorado River.

State Water Project
The State Water Project, also known as the California Aqueduct, transports water  from Northern California to the southern portion of the state.

Colorado River Project
The Colorado River Aqueduct brings water  from the Colorado River through deserts and over mountain ranges to its terminal reservoir, Lake Mathews, in Riverside County. The aqueduct system includes five pumping plants that lift the water .

Recycled Water

IRWD produces approximately 21 percent of its supply by treating wastewater and reusing it for irrigation and other non-potable, or non-drinking, uses. The primary uses of recycled water are agricultural and landscape irrigation including parks, school grounds, golf courses, freeway landscaping and irrigation of common areas managed by homeowner associations. Recycled water is also used for front and backyard irrigation in large residential lots, for industrial processes, and for toilet flushing and cooling towers in dozens of dual-plumbed office buildings. The color of recycled water pipes, known worldwide as Irvine Purple, originated at IRWD.

Urban Runoff

The California Water Code Section 35539.12 grants IRWD the authority to provide urban runoff treatment services within the District. Urban runoff is the excess water that carries pollutants into storm drains and then to the ocean.  Residents who live miles inland can contribute to ocean pollution simply by leaving their sprinklers on too long. After this wasted water flows to the curb it carries trash, fertilizers, pet waste and other pollutants into the storm drain system which flows into San Diego Creek, eventually ending up in ecologically sensitive Upper Newport Bay and the Pacific ocean. Urban runoff can be prevented by implementing efficient irrigation practices. Additionally, an urban runoff treatment system, like the IRWD Natural Treatment System program, helps protect the San Diego Creek Watershed by naturally removing some of the contaminants in from urban runoff before it reaches the ocean.

Water Rates 

The district uses an allocation-based conservation rate structure.

Under this system, each customer receives a basic allocation of water that provides a reasonable amount of water for customer needs and property characteristics, including the number of occupants, lot size, size of irrigated area, climate, etc.  A customer's cost of water is based upon how much water a customer uses (measured by reading the customers meter) and whether or not the customer stayed within his or her allocation.

If a customer's water usage exceeds his or her monthly allocation, their cost of water will increase due to the need for IRWD to purchase more expensive sources of water, such as imported water from the Metropolitan Water District of Southern California.

In an attempt to ensure equity among its customers, the IRWD separates the cost of building water and sewer infrastructure from the cost of daily operations and maintenance. Infrastructure costs, called capital projects, are financed through general obligation bonds, the debt service for these is paid through a combination of property taxes and connection fees.  Daily operation and maintenance costs, which are further separated between the water and sewer systems, are funded through monthly user service charges. The IRWD's basic principle behind these precise allocations of cost is that each end-user pays his fair share, no more and no less.

District Finances & Investments 
IRWD uses a long-range planning approach that eliminates the need for dramatic increases in customer rates to pay for new infrastructure (pipes, pumps, reservoirs, etc.) or for the inevitable repair and the replacement of these types of facilities as they begin to age.

Financial Reports
Public agencies such as IRWD do not issue a traditional annual report, but rather a much fuller report called a Comprehensive Annual Financial Report or CAFR. The report highlights major projects and initiatives in addition to financial data. The CAFR has been the annual financial report of choice for public agencies since it was established in 1945 by the Government Finance Officers Association (GFOA). Reports submitted to the CAFR program are reviewed by selected members of the GFOA professional staff and the GFOA Special Review Committee (SRC), which comprises individuals with expertise in public-sector financial reporting and includes financial statement preparers, independent auditors, academics, and other finance professionals.

IRWD's CAFR has received a Certificate of Achievement for Excellence in each year a CAFR was prepared. This award recognizes governments whose CAFRs achieve the highest standards in government accounting and financial reporting.

Operating Budget

Each year the IRWD Board of Directors approves an annual operating budget at a public meeting for the fiscal year which runs from July 1 through June 30 of each year. The IRWD Operating Budget provides the financial plan required to implement the District's workplan for the year.

References 

Government in Orange County, California
Water management authorities in California
Irvine, California
Costa Mesa, California
Lake Forest, California
Newport Beach, California
Orange, California
Tustin, California
1961 establishments in California
Government agencies established in 1961